Levate is a comune (municipality) in the Province of Bergamo in the Italian region of Lombardy, located about  northeast of Milan and about  southwest of Bergamo.

Levate borders the following municipalities: Comun Nuovo, Dalmine, Osio Sopra, Osio Sotto, Stezzano, Verdellino, Verdello.

References